Jami Mosque (مسجد جامع) is a mosque in Toronto, Ontario, Canada. Located just east of High Park, it is the oldest Canadian Islamic centre in the city and dubbed "the mother of all the mosques in Toronto".

Built in 1910 as a Presbyterian church, the building was purchased in 1969 by Toronto's small, predominantly Bosniak and Albanians Muslim community and converted into the city's first Islamic worship centre.

While Jami originally held a large number of Tablighi Jamaat followers, the numbers declined after a large influx of Gujarati Muslims immigration led to the leasing of a hall in eastern Toronto; and the eventual 1981 purchase of a building converted to Madina Mosque, which became the spiritual hub of Tablighi Jamaat. Jami then drifted towards finding leadership in the Muslim Students Association.

See also

List of mosques in Canada
  List of mosques in the Americas
  Lists of mosques

References

External links 
 Jami Mosque 

Bosniak diaspora
Gujarati diaspora
Indo-Canadian culture
Mosques in Toronto
Toronto